Ai Kotoba (Voice) (Japanese: 愛言葉 (Voice), Love Language) is the fifth album (the first under Avex Trax) released by Maki Goto on November 2, 2011. It comes in three editions:
 CD-Only (AVCD-38364)
 CD+DVD (AVCD-38363)
 2CD+2DVD (AVCD-38365-6); includes: DVD featuring music videos, 15 postcards featuring Maki Goto's shot in Shinjuku by Nicola Formichetti, a bonus CD "Collabo-Works Disc", a second DVD "Making Movie Disc")

Track listing

Charts

Release History

References

External links
Oricon Profile: 2CD+2DVD | CD+DVD | CD-Only

Maki Goto albums
2011 albums
Electropop albums